WrestleMania XII was the 12th annual WrestleMania professional wrestling pay-per-view (PPV) event produced by the World Wrestling Federation (WWF, now WWE). It took place on March 31, 1996, at the Arrowhead Pond of Anaheim in Anaheim, California in the United States. A total of eight matches were held at the event, including two on the Free for All pre-show.

In the main event, Bret Hart lost the WWF Championship to Shawn Michaels in the first televised Iron Man match in company history, lasting over 60 minutes. In his return to the company after a four-year hiatus, The Ultimate Warrior defeated Hunter Hearst Helmsley. Roddy Piper had his first match since 1994, after which he left for rival promotion World Championship Wrestling.

Production

Background 
WrestleMania is considered the World Wrestling Federation's (WWF, now WWE) flagship pay-per-view (PPV) event, having first been held in 1985. It has become the longest-running professional wrestling event in history and is held annually between mid-March to mid-April. It was the first of the WWF's original four pay-per-views, which includes Royal Rumble, SummerSlam, and Survivor Series, which were dubbed the "Big Four", and was considered one of the "Big Five" PPVs, along with King of the Ring. WrestleMania XII was scheduled to be held on March 31, 1996, at the Arrowhead Pond of Anaheim in Anaheim, California.

Storylines 
The main attraction of this WrestleMania was the WWF Championship contested in an Iron Man match; whereby the winner would be the man to win most falls over sixty minutes. Michaels had earned the opportunity to face reigning champion Bret Hart by winning the 1996 Royal Rumble, and had also defeated Owen Hart at In Your House 6 for the right to keep the WrestleMania title shot.

The main event was built on Bret Hart wanting to retain the WWF Championship against Shawn Michaels, who had suffered a number of setbacks over the course of the previous year, including failing to win Diesel's WWF Championship the previous year at WrestleMania XI in April 1995, being accosted at a Syracuse, New York nightclub in October 1995 (and subsequently forfeiting the WWF Intercontinental Championship to Dean Douglas at In Your House 4), and suffering a storyline concussion at the hands of Owen Hart in November 1995.

Hunter Hearst Helmsley made his debut in the WWF in May 1995, with his wrestling gimmick being in that he was a rich snob born with a silver spoon in his mouth. He went on an undefeated winning streak throughout the year. The Ultimate Warrior meanwhile had left the WWF in 1992 after failing a drug test. His last match was on the November 14, 1992 edition of Saturday Night's Main Event XXXI, where he and "Macho Man" Randy Savage defeated Ted DiBiase and Irwin R. Schyster in a tag team match. WWF officials later signed on a match between Ultimate Warrior, who re-signed to the WWF in an attempt to increase ratings, and the undefeated Helmsley for WrestleMania XII.

Event 
 
The opening bout, which aired on the free-for-all broadcast, was a tag team match for the vacant WWF Tag Team Championship between The Bodydonnas (Skip and Zip) and The Godwinns (Henry O. Godwinn and Phineas I. Godwinn). This match was the final bout of a tournament held to determine the new champions after the titles were vacated in February 1996. The match ended when Skip pinned Phineas I. Godwinn using a roll-up, making The Bodydonnas the new WWF Tag Team Champions.

The second bout, which also aired on the free-for-all broadcast, was a singles match (billed as a "geriatric match") between "The Huckster" and "Nacho Man", two characters created to parody Hulk Hogan and "Macho Man" Randy Savage (former WWF performers who had joined its competitor World Championship Wrestling). The referee for the match was "Billionaire Ted", a parody of Ted Turner, the owner of World Championship Wrestling's parent company Turner Broadcasting System. This bout marked the culmination of a series of skits the WWF had aired featuring the three characters. This match did not take place in the Arrowhead Pond, having been pre-recorded elsewhere. The match ended in a no contest when both competitors, along with Billionaire Ted, seemingly expired in the ring.

The third bout, and the first bout to air on the pay-per-view broadcast proper, was a six-man tag team match pitting The British Bulldog, Owen Hart, and Vader (Camp Cornette) against Ahmed Johnson, Jake Roberts, and Yokozuna, with the stipulation that if Yokozuna's team won he would receive five minutes in the ring with Jim Cornette, the manager of Camp Cornette. The match ended when Roberts attempted to give Cornette a DDT, only for Vader to knock Roberts down and pin him following a Vader Bomb.

The fourth bout was a "Hollywood Backlot Brawl" between Goldust and Roddy Piper. The match began in a parking lot, with the men brawling and using weapons. After Goldust fled in a gold Cadillac, Piper pursued him in a white Ford Bronco.

The fifth bout was a singles match between Savio Vega and Stone Cold Steve Austin. Austin won the bout by technical knockout after hitting Vega with the Million Dollar Championship then applying the Million Dollar Dream to Vega until he passed out.

During and after the fifth bout, footage aired of what was purportedly Piper pursuing Goldust (the actual footage aired was from the Los Angeles Police Department's pursuit of O.J. Simpson from 1994).

The sixth bout was a singles match between Hunter Hearst Helmsley and The Ultimate Warrior. Early in the match, Helmsley performed his finishing move, The Pedigree, on The Ultimate Warrior. However, The Ultimate Warrior no-sold the move and went on to pin Helmsley following a flying shoulder tackle, gorilla press slam, and Warrior Splash.

Following the sixth bout, Todd Pettengill interviewed the debuting Marc Mero backstage. The interview was interrupted by Hunter Hearst Helmsley, resulting in a brawl between Helmsley and Mero.

The seventh bout was a singles match between Diesel and The Undertaker. The Undertaker won the match by pinfall following a chokeslam and Tombstone Piledriver, marking his fifth consecutive win at WrestleMania.

Following the seventh bout, Goldust and Piper arrived at the Arrowhead Pond, with Piper crashing his car into Goldust's car. Piper then chased Goldust to the ring, where the match continued. The match ended when Piper tore off Goldust's bodysuit - revealing him to be wearing woman's lingerie - and gave him a low blow, after which Goldust fled from the ring, leaving Piper the winner.

The main event saw WWF Champion Bret Hart defend his title against Shawn Michaels in an Iron Man match, with the stipulation that whichever wrestler won the most falls in 60 minutes would win the match. Towards the end of the match, with neither men having won any falls, Hart applied his Sharpshooter hold to Michaels, but time expired without Michaels submitting. As Hart began to leave with his title, WWF President Gorilla Monsoon instructed referee Earl Hebner to continue the match under "sudden death" rules, with ring announcer Howard Finkel announcing that "There must be a winner!" The match ended shortly thereafter when Michaels pinned Hart after giving him Sweet Chin Music twice, thus becoming the new WWF Champion.

Reception 
WrestleMania XII received generally positive reviews from critics, who aimed praise, particularly at the main event. Rob McNew of 411mania called the opening match "really good," and gave it 3 and 1/4 stars (out of 5 stars). However, he called the match between Helmsley and The Ultimate Warrior the worst of the night, going on to call it the "funniest squash ever, considering that HHH is now arguably a bigger star than Warrior was." He gave the main event the highest score of the night, with 4 stars. However, he says the match "isn't for everyone." Continuing, he says, "It's about a three-star match for the first 40 minutes, the last 20+ are an easy five stars." He gave the entire event a score of 7 out of 10. In 2015, Ryan Dilbert of Bleacher Report called it the 16th greatest of the first 30 WrestleMania events.

While the Iron Man match get positive reviews, PWInsider's Mike Johnson pointed that the match wan't that good and that both wrestlers "were working in spite of each other, not together".

Results

WWF Tag Team Championship tournament 
In February 1996, WWF Tag Team Champions The Smoking Gunns were forced to vacate the titles after Billy Gunn sustained a neck injury. As a result, a tournament was staged in February and March 1996 to determine the new champions, with the matches airing on tape delay Superstars throughout March. The tournament final was held at WrestleMania XII, with The Bodydonnas defeating The Godwinns to be crowned the new champions.

Other on-screen personnel

References

External links 
 
 

1996 in California
1996 WWF pay-per-view events
Events in Anaheim, California
March 1996 events in the United States
Professional wrestling in Anaheim, California
WrestleMania